Absalom Koiner (August 5, 1824 – December 31, 1920) was an American lawyer and politician who served in the Virginia House of Delegates and Virginia Senate.

References

External links

1824 births
1920 deaths
Democratic Party Virginia state senators
19th-century American politicians
19th-century American lawyers
Virginia lawyers
People from Augusta County, Virginia